The Convention of Nymegen (alt. spelling Nijmegen or Nymwegen) was a treaty signed between England and Spain in 1573. The treaty pledged that the English government would cease support for raids on Spanish shipping in the West Indies and Caribbean by English privateers such as Drake and Hawkins.

It is not to be confused with the Treaties of Nijmegen, concluded in 1678 and 1679, ending the wars between France and the Dutch Republic, and other states.

Treasure crisis of 1568
The original source of the dispute was Elizabeth's seizure of gold from Spanish money ships in English ports in November 1568. Chased by privateers in the English channel, five small Spanish ships carrying gold and silver worth 400,000 florins (£85,000) sought shelter in the harbors at Plymouth and Southampton. The English government headed by William Cecil gave its permission. The money was bound for the Netherlands as payment for Spanish soldiers. When Queen Elizabeth discovered that the gold was not owned by Spain, but was still owned by Italian bankers.  She decided to seize it, and treated it as a loan from the Italian bankers to England.  The bankers agree to her terms, so Elizabeth had the money and she eventually repaid the bankers.  Spain reacted furiously and seized English property in the Netherlands and Spain.  England reacted by seizing Spanish ships and properties in England.  Spain reacted by imposing an embargo preventing all English imports into the Netherlands for five years. The bitter diplomatic standoff lasted for years. However neither side wanted war.

The subsequent absence of funds later led to a revolt by the unpaid Spanish army which in the Low Countries resulted in the sacking of Antwerp in 1576, known as the Spanish Fury. As part of the Convention of Nymegen, Elizabeth returned this seized gold to Genoese bankers.

The treaty also laid out provisions for resumed diplomatic and commercial relations between Spain and England. Trading had been suspended but had proven far too damaging to both countries to not be reinstated. The treaty was based on the principles that all merchants would be compensated for losses, and that neither side would shelter or protect rebels or privateers. Furthermore, it was agreed that the Duke of Alva would leave the Netherlands, thereby reducing tensions.

These provisions were formalised in the Convention of Bristol in August 1574.

The Nymegen treaty was signed by Elizabeth I and representatives of the Spanish commander, the Duke of Alva.

Motivation
Neutrality seemed the best policy for Elizabeth, who favoured a reactive, expedient foreign policy. There seemed little point in supporting the remaining rebels in the provinces (Netherlands) as Spain's military power there grew and France increasingly withdrew from foreign affairs, embroiled in its own civil war.

Convention of Bristol 
England and Spain signed the Treaty of Bristol (or "Convention of Bristol") on 21 August.  England admitted it owed Spanish claims of £90,000, Versus English claims of £70,000. England paid Spain the difference of £20,000. It temporarily reversed the deterioration in relations that it followed the treasure crisis of 1568, Producing a six-year period of relative friendly and stable relations.

Consequences
Trade resumed between England and Spain and relations improved. Elizabeth resisted pressure from her advisors Walsingham and Leicester to openly offer help to William of Orange in the Netherlands. She did not, however, interfere when he recruited Protestant volunteers in England to his cause.

References

Further reading
 

 MacCaffrey, Wallace T. The Shaping of the Elizabethan Regime (1968) pp 271–90.
 

1573 treaties
Treaties of England
Treaties of the Spanish Empire
England–Spain relations
1573 in England
1573 in Spain
History of Nijmegen